S Timbira (S-32)  was the third  of the Brazilian Navy.

Construction and career
The boat was built at Arsenal de Marinha do Rio de Janeiro in Rio de Janeiro and was launched on 5 January 1996 and commissioned on 16 December 1996.

Gallery

References

External links

Ships built in Brazil
Tupi-class submarines
1996 ships